Favartia (Favartia) natalensis is a species of sea snail, a marine gastropod mollusk in the family Muricidae, the murex snails or rock snails.

Description

Distribution
Specimen collections and observations of Favartia Natalensis have occurred along the Eastern South-African coast by E. A. Smith noted in 1906, with five such occurrences between Durban and East London. Their habitat is in the Marine Benthic Zone at latitude 32.1667°S and longitude 28.9667°E.

References

 Kilburn, R.N. & Rippey, E. (1982) Sea Shells of Southern Africa. Macmillan South Africa, Johannesburg, xi + 249 pp. page(s): 82 
 Houart R., Kilburn R.N. & Marais A.P. (2010) Muricidae. pp. 176–270, in: Marais A.P. & Seccombe A.D. (eds), Identification guide to the seashells of South Africa. Volume 1. Groenkloof: Centre for Molluscan Studies. 376 pp.

Muricidae
Gastropods described in 1906